The 12th British Academy Film Awards, given by the British Academy of Film and Television Arts in 1959, honoured the best films of 1958.

Winners and nominees

Best Film
Room at the Top
 Aparajito
 Cat on a Hot Tin Roof
 The Cranes Are Flying
 The Defiant Ones
 Ice Cold in Alex
 Indiscreet
 Le Notti di Cabiria
 No Down Payment
 Orders to Kill
 Sea of Sand
 The Sheepman
 Wild Strawberries
 The Young Lions

Best British Film
Room at the Top
 Ice Cold in Alex
 Indiscreet
 Orders to Kill
 Sea of Sand

Best Foreign Actor
Sidney Poitier in The Defiant Ones
 Paul Newman in Cat on a Hot Tin Roof
 Tony Curtis in The Defiant Ones
 Curd Jürgens in The Enemy Below
 Curd Jürgens in The Inn of the Sixth Happiness
 Spencer Tracy in The Last Hurrah
 Glenn Ford in The Sheepman
 Victor Sjöström in Wild Strawberries
 Charles Laughton in Witness for the Prosecution
 Marlon Brando in The Young Lions

Best British Actor
Trevor Howard in The Key
 I. S. Johar in Harry Black
 Anthony Quayle in Ice Cold in Alex
 Laurence Harvey in Room at the Top
 Donald Wolfit in Room at the Top
 Michael Craig in Sea of Sand
 Terry-Thomas in tom thumb

Best British Actress
Irene Worth in Orders to Kill
 Virginia McKenna in Carve Her Name with Pride
 Elizabeth Taylor in Cat on a Hot Tin Roof
 Hermione Baddeley in Room at the Top

Best Foreign Actress
Simone Signoret in Room at the Top
 Karuna Banerjee in Aparajito
 Tatiana Samoilova in The Cranes Are Flying
 Ingrid Bergman in The Inn of the Sixth Happiness
 Giulietta Masina in Nights of Cabiria
 Joanne Woodward in No Down Payment
 Anna Magnani in Wild Is the Wind

Best British Screenplay
Orders to Kill – Paul Dehn

Film012
British Academy Film Awards
British Academy Film Awards